Daria Kobets (born 2000) is a Ukrainian female rhythmic gymnast. She is member of Ukrainian rhythmic gymnastics national team since 2017. At the 2018 Rhythmic Gymnastics European Championships in Guadalajara she won two silver medals in team events.

References

External links 
 

2000 births
Living people
Ukrainian rhythmic gymnasts
Medalists at the Rhythmic Gymnastics European Championships
21st-century Ukrainian women